Daniel Gadzuric (born 2 February 1978) is a Dutch-Serbian former professional basketball player.

Gadzuric, a center, attended preparatory school at The Governor's Academy in Byfield, Massachusetts, before playing college basketball for the Bruins at University of California, Los Angeles (UCLA).

Professional career 
Gadzuric was drafted by the Milwaukee Bucks during the 2002 NBA Draft.

On June 22, 2010, Gadzuric and Charlie Bell were traded to the Golden State Warriors for Corey Maggette after spending eight years with the Bucks.

On February 23, 2011, Gadzuric was traded to the New Jersey Nets along with Brandan Wright in exchange for Troy Murphy and a second round pick.

In October 2011, he signed with the Jiangsu Dragons in China.

He was signed by the New York Knicks on April 20, 2012. This ended up being his final season in the NBA, as Gadzuric's final game was on April 26th, 2012 in a 104 - 84 win over the Charlotte Bobcats where he recorded 3 rebounds, 1 steal and 1 block.

On July 16, 2012, Gadzuric, Jared Jeffries, the rights to Giorgos Printezis and Kostas Papanikolaou and a 2016 second round pick were traded to the Portland Trail Blazers for Kurt Thomas and Raymond Felton.

On July 19, 2012, Gadzuric was waived by the Portland Trail Blazers. In September 2012, he joined the Philadelphia 76ers for their training camp. However, he did not make their final roster.

In February 2013, he joined the Marinos de Anzoátegui of the Venezuelan Liga Profesional de Baloncesto (LPB). With Marinos, he went on to lose the LPB finals to Cocodrilos de Caracas after a seven-game series.

On September 27, 2013, he signed with the Los Angeles Lakers. However, he was waived on October 9.

National team career
He made his debut on December 26, 1997, in an exhibition game against  at the Haarlem Basketball Week. He went scoreless in 10 minutes of play, and it took ten years until he played another game with the Netherlands. In 2011, he played in another friendly game at the EuroJam 2011 tournament. Gadzuric never played in any FIBA official games for his national team.

Family 
Gadzuric's mother is from Belgrade, Serbia and his father is from Kingstown, St. Vincent and the Grenadines.

Accomplishments 
Gadzuric was named to the McDonald's All-American Team.

NBA career statistics

Regular season 

|-
| align="left" | 
| align="left" | Milwaukee
| 49 || 30 || 15.5 || .483 || .000 || .518 || 4.0 || .2 || .4 || 1.1 || 3.4
|-
| align="left" | 
| align="left" | Milwaukee
| 75 || 0 || 16.8 || .524 || .000 || .492 || 4.6 || .4 || .7 || 1.4 || 5.7
|-
| align="left" | 
| align="left" | Milwaukee
| 81 || 81 || 22.0 || .539 || .000 || .538 || 8.3 || .4 || .6 || 1.3 || 7.3
|-
| align="left" | 
| align="left" | Milwaukee
| 74 || 0 || 12.0 || .553 || .000 || .461 || 3.1 || .3 || .3 || .6 || 5.2
|-
| align="left" | 
| align="left" | Milwaukee
| 54 || 8 || 15.6 || .474 || .000 || .467 || 4.6 || .5 || .4 || .6 || 4.8
|-
| align="left" | 
| align="left" | Milwaukee
| 51 || 4 || 10.5 || .416 || .000 || .524 || 2.8 || .2 || .4 || .5 || 3.2
|-
| align="left" | 
| align="left" | Milwaukee
| 67 || 26 || 14.0 || .480 || .000 || .544 || 3.8 || .6 || .5 || .6 || 4.0
|-
| align="left" | 
| align="left" | Milwaukee
| 32 || 6 || 9.8 || .438 || .000 || .400 || 2.9 || .4 || .3 || .4 || 2.8
|-
| align="left" | 
| align="left" | Golden State
| 28 || 4 || 10.6 || .420 || .000 || .357 || 3.1 || .4 || .4 || .6 || 2.8
|-
| align="left" | 
| align="left" | New Jersey
| 14 || 5 || 11.9 || .415 || .000 || .385 || 3.5 || .2 || .2 || .8 || 2.8
|-
| align="left" | 
| align="left" | New York
| 2 || 0 || 6.5 || .000 || .000 || .000 || 2.5 || .0 || .5 || .5 || .0
|- class="sortbottom"
| style="text-align:center;" colspan="2"| Career
| 527 || 164 || 14.8 || .500 || .000 || .498 || 4.4 || .4 || .5 || .9 || 4.7

Playoffs 

|-
| align="left" | 2004
| align="left" | Milwaukee
| 1 || 0 || 9.0 || .500 || .000 || .000 || 1.0 || 2.0 || 1.0 || .0 || 4.0
|-
| align="left" | 2006
| align="left" | Milwaukee
| 4 || 0 || 4.0 || .889 || .000 || .500 || 1.0 || .0 || .0 || .3 || 4.3
|-
| align="left" | 2010
| align="left" | Milwaukee
| 7 || 0 || 10.9 || .529 || .000 || .250 || 3.4 || .1 || .1 || .7 || 2.7
|- class="sortbottom"
| style="text-align:center;" colspan="2"| Career
| 12 || 0 || 8.3 || .633 || .000 || .286 || 2.4 || .3 || .2 || .5 || 3.3

See also
 
List of sportspeople with dual nationality
 List of European basketball players in the United States

References

External links

UCLA Bruins bio
Gadzuric Foundation

1978 births
Living people
Centers (basketball)
Dutch expatriate basketball people in the United States
Dutch men's basketball players
Dutch people of Saint Vincent and the Grenadines descent
Dutch people of Serbian descent
Golden State Warriors players
Jiangsu Dragons players
Marinos B.B.C. players
McDonald's High School All-Americans
Milwaukee Bucks draft picks
Milwaukee Bucks players
National Basketball Association players from the Netherlands
New Jersey Nets players
New York Knicks players
Parade High School All-Americans (boys' basketball)
Petrochimi Bandar Imam BC players
Sportspeople from The Hague
Texas Legends players
UCLA Bruins men's basketball players
The Governor's Academy alumni